Centricity Music is an American contemporary Christian music record label that was founded in Washington. The label's roster includes artists such as Lauren Daigle, Jordan Feliz, Jason Gray, North Point Worship, Andrew Peterson and NEEDTOBREATHE.

History
Centricity Music was started in 2003 by a Seattle family. Soon after, the label started an office in Nashville.

Centricity Music houses recording and publishing divisions. The label is known for their focus on artist development. Downhere's Glen Lavender was quoted saying that "Centricity's philosophy is more about 'building the artist up.' It takes time to develop an artist. That's not usually how things are done [with labels these days], but it makes way more sense."

Centricity's first album release was downhere's Wide-Eyed and Mystified in May 2006. The label then released records by Jaime Jamgochian and Circleslide also in 2006.

Wide-Eyed and Mystified was distributed by Warner Music Group, but in March 2010 Centricity signed a new agreement with Universal Music Group to distribute all past and future releases.

Centricity Music's mission statement is "to enable our artists to create life-changing experiences for the world."

Roster

Active

 Apollo LTD
 Lauren Daigle
 Jordan Feliz
 Jason Gray
 Brandon Heath
 Coby James
 Patrick Mayberry
 Peabod
 Centricity Worship
 Katy Nichole
 North Point Worship
 Andrew Peterson
 Chris Renzema
 Unspoken

Former

 Jared Anderson
 Bethlehem Skyline
 Carrollton
 Circleslide (active, on Save the City Records)
 Jonny Diaz
 Downhere
 Neon Feather
 Grayson/Reed
 Lanae' Hale
 High Valley
 Caitie Hurst
 Jaime Jamgochian
 Daniel Kirkley
 Lindsay McCaul
 Me in Motion
 Matt Papa
 Remedy Drive
 For All Seasons
 Aaron Shust
 Sixteen Cities
 JJ Weeks Band

See also
 List of record labels

References

External links
 

American record labels